Nend (Nent), or Angaua, is a Papuan language spoken by the Angaua people of Madang Province, Papua New Guinea. It is spoken in Pasinkap village of Arabaka Rural LLG, Madang Province.

References

External links

Rosetta Project: Nend Swadesh list

Sogeram languages
Languages of Madang Province